Shikrapur may refer to:

Shikrapur, Maharashtra, a panchayat village in the state of Maharashtra, India
Shikrapur, Budaun, a village & gram panchayat in Uttar Pradesh, India